Janet Schwartz is an American behavioral scientist. She was elected as an American Psychological Association fellow in January 2018. Schwartz has worked with government agencies, including the FBI, the National Science Foundation, and the Defense Intelligence Agency. Her work has focused on creating profiles of criminals and developing strategies to combat organized crime.

Education 

She earned a BS degree in elementary education from Valparaiso University. She holds Master’s degree and a PhD in Psychology in education from University of Pittsburgh.

Career 

Throughout her professional career, Schwartz has collaborated with a range of government entities, such as the Federal Bureau of Investigation (FBI), the National Science Foundation, and the Defense Intelligence Agency, among others.

Her work has focused on creating profiles of criminals and developing strategies to combat organized crime. Schwartz has also authored publications, including the "Psychological Profile of a Spy" and "Overcoming Resistance on the Local Level."

In recent years, She has partnered with forensic psychiatrists in Saudi Arabia to establish the country's first domestic violence and child abuse clinic and serves as an advisor to a project that works with radicalized youth in Lebanon.

Bibliography

Selected publications

References 

Living people
Fellows of the American Psychological Association
University of Pittsburgh alumni
Valparaiso University alumni